Work, Employment & Society is a peer-reviewed academic journal that publishes papers in the fields of economics and industrial relations. It has been in publication since 1984 and is currently published by SAGE Publications on behalf of the British Sociological Association.

Scope 
Work, Employment & Society publishes theoretically informed and original research on the sociology of work. The journal aims to cover all aspects of work, employment and unemployment and their connections with wider social processes and social structures.

Abstracting and indexing 
Work, Employment and Society is abstracted and indexed in, among other databases:  SCOPUS, and the Social Sciences Citation Index. According to the Journal Citation Reports, its 2019 impact factor is 5.116, ranking 32 out of 377 journals in the category "Economics". and ranking it 7 out of 149 journals in the category "Sociology". and 2 out of 30 journals in the category "Industrial Relations and Labor".

References

External links 
 
 BSA Official Website

SAGE Publishing academic journals
English-language journals
1987 establishments in the United Kingdom
Publications established in 1987
Economics journals
Sociology journals
British Sociological Association
Bimonthly journals